Bang Rakam is a subdistrict in the Bang Rakam District of Phitsanulok Province, Thailand.

Geography
Bang Rakam lies in the Yom Basin, which is part of the Chao Phraya Watershed. The Yom River flows through the subdistrict.

Administration

Industry
Ban Wang Gum is home to the Phitsanulok plant of Tipco Asphalt PCL. Tipco manufactures cationic asphalt emulsion, cutback asphalt and polymer modified asphalt cement.

References

Tambon of Phitsanulok province
Populated places in Phitsanulok province